Bent Lorentzen (11 February 1935, Stenvad – 3 October 2018, Copenhagen) was a Danish composer. He was one of the outstanding figures in contemporary Danish music. His works are frequently performed at festivals at home and abroad, and he had established particularly close links with musical life in Poland and Germany. He was honoured with several international prizes and was named Choral Composer of the Year in Denmark in 1989 (Source: Edition·S – music¬sound¬art – Denmark).

Life 
Bent Lorentzen was born in Stenvad, a village on Djursland, East Jutland. He studied musicology at the university in Aarhus and at the Royal Danish Academy of Music in Copenhagen. He was a pupil of Knud Jeppesen, Finn Høffding, Vagn Holmboe and Jørgen Jersild. After his final examination he taught at the Academies of Music in Aarhus and Copenhagen for several years. (Source: Bonde 2005)

Lorentzen was one of the earliest pioneers in the field of Danish electronic music (The Bottomless Pit in 1972 for the Nordic Music Days in Oslo, and Visions 1978), which was also introduced with an educational aim: the LP Elektronmusikkens materiale [The Material of Electronic Music, 1968] and the LP Water – electronic music for children, 1968. (Source: Bonde 2005)

Lorentzen's orchestral music includes concertos for oboe (1980), cello (1984), piano (1984), saxophone (1986), trumpet (1991) and violin (2001); his chamber music comprises solo works for organ, piano, trumpet, saxophone, clarinet, guitar, violin, cello and double-bass, as well as string quartets and works with mixed ensembles (2-12 instruments). He also composed numerous choral works in a unique dramatic style.
Lorentzen's most important part of his works, however, are his operas and other works for the stage. His last opera  Der Steppenwolf (Libretto after Hermann Hesse's novel by Michael Leinert) was first performed in Aarhus 2016 in a semi-concert version.

Awards 
Lorentzen held a number of important posts in different organisations in the Danish musical life, and he was the artistic director of the Ebeltoft Festival 1990-93. He was a prizewinner at several foreign competitions such as the Prix Italia in 1970 (for the opera Euridice), the Serocki composers’ competition in 1984 (for the chamber work Paradiesvogel), the International Competition for Choir Compositions in Austria 1987 (for Olof Palme), the Olivier Messiaen Organ Prize in 1988 (for Luna), Vienna Modern Masters in 1991 (for the Piano Concerto) and the Music and Poetry Prize in Belgium in 1989 (for Enzensberger’s Prozession). He was awarded ”Danish Choir Composer of the year” in 1990 and the Carl Nielsen Prize in 1995 and in 2003 the Wilhelm Hansen Composer Prize. Since 1982 and until his death, Lorentzen had received the lifelong grant of the Danish Art Council. (Source: Bonde 2005)

Selected works
Bent Lorentzen’s works are published  in Denmark by Edition Wilhem Hansen, Copenhagen and Edition Samfundet, Copenhagen.

Opera and musical theatre 
Bill and Julia (1991) 
Cain and Abel (2005/06)
Do You Know The Tune They're Playing? (Die Musik kommt mir äusserst bekannt vor) – Mozart Panorama (1974) 
Eine Wundersame Liebesgeschichte (A wondrous love story) -Tristan Variations (1979)
The End!? (1969)
Euridice (1965; radio opera 1969)
Fackeltanz (1993) 
Friisholm (1971) 
Den Stundesløse/The Fussy Man (1994), after the play by Ludvig Holberg 
Orfeo (1992), after Monteverdi's opera 
Pergolesi's Homeservice (1998), after Pergolesi's "La Serva Padrona" 
The Magic Brillant (1994)
The Serpent (1964;1974)
Stalten Mette (1963; 1980; TV 1981)
Studies for Two (1967) 
Toto The Clown (1985) 
Der Steppenwolf (1999), after the novel by Hermann Hesse
 Jeppe (2009), after the play by Ludvig Holberg

Orchestra 
Latin Suite I (1984)
Partita (1976) 
Tide (1971)

Soloist(s) and orchestra
Cello Concerto (1984) 
Gewitter im Juni (2000) 
Hunting Concerto (1996)
My Bride is Like a Garden (1972) 
Oboe Concerto (1980) 
Partita (1994) 
Piano Concerto (1984) 
Saxophone Concerto (1986) 
Tivoli (2006) 
Violin Concerto (2001)
Regenbogen (1991)
Double concerto for trumpet and trombone (1999)

Large ensemble (7 or more players) 
Cyclus 4 
Paesaggio (1983) 
Paradiesvogel (1983) 
Wunderblumen (1982) 
Zauberspiegel (1998) 
Steppenwolf-Fragment (2000)

Works for 2-6 players 
Flamma (2001) 
Mambo (1982) 
Orfeo Suite (1992) 
Quadrata (1963) 
Quartetto Barbaro (1990) 
Samba (1980) 
Schumann-variations (1993) 
Warszawa (1983) 
Cello Scenes (1990)

Solo works (excluding keyboard) 
Birds (2001) 
Circles (1996) 
Cries (1991) 
Round (1981)
Diamond (1983) 
Granite (1971) 
Quartz (1971)
Sif's Golden Hair (2006) 
Tears (1992) 
Tiefe (1993) 
Circus (2001)

Solo keyboard(s) 
Jupiter (1995) 
Luna (1984) 
Mars (1985) 
Saturnus (1996) 
Sirrum (1986) 
Sun (1982) 
Triplex (1974) 
Venus (1996)
Nachtigall (1988) 
Nimbus (1977) 
Puncti (1972)

Solo voices, chorus, orchestra, narrator
Genesis (1992)
The Tinder Box (2003)
Comics (1987)

Chorus a cappella / chorus plus one instrument 
3 Madrigals (1977 
Ammen Dammen Des (1981) 
Auschwitz (1987) 
Graffiti (1984) 
Mund (1989)
Olof Palme (1986) 
Prozession (1988)
Purgatorio (1975)

Solo voice(s) and up to six players 
11 Danish Lovesongs (2003) 
Erotic Hymns (1998) 
Carnaval (1976) 
Dejligste rose (1989) 
Den Lidendes Mund (2000) 
Far verden, far vel (1989) 
Fire Kingo-koralmotetter (2004) 
Her vil ties, her vil bies (1989) 
Ich bin eine Rose (1988) 
Når mit øje, træt af møje (1989) 
Siv Vand og Måne (1997) 
Tristan und die Künigîn (1987)

Music for young performers 
9 Easy Pieces for Strings (1964)

Electroacoustic works 
The Bottomless Pit (1972) 
Cloud-Drift (1973) 
Visions (1978)

Selected discography

5 Easy Pieces 
Abgrund - Colori  - Goldranken - Nachtigall

Piano Works
Dacapo: 8.224246
	
Do You Know The Tune They're Playing - Mozart Panorama
Die Musik kommt mir äusserst bekannt vor!

Chamber opera
Helikon: HCD 1012

Hunting Concerto 
Ensemble  Århus Sinfonietta
Conductor Søren K. Hansen and Thomas Søndergaard

Dacapo: 8.226516

Intersection 
Aarhus Brass Quintet

Paula: PACD 82
	
Mambo 
Ensemble  The Danish Trio

Paula: PACD 57 
	
Contemporary Denmark 1992
The Danish Trio, Esbjerg Ensemble, Kontra etc.

Danish Music Export: MXPCD 0292	

 Concertos for Oboe and Trumpet
Ensemble  Aarhus SO, Frans Rasmussen

Merete Hoffmann (oboe), Martin Schuster (trumpet)

Dacapo: DCCD 9314

Piano Concerto 
Ensemble Århus Sinfonietta

Conductor Søren K. Hansen and Thomas Søndergaard

Erik Kaltoft (piano)

Dacapo: 8.226516

Piano Concerto Music From Six Continents

Ensemble Slovak RSO, Szymon Kawalla

Vienna Modern Masters: VMM 3009

Syncretism 
Composers: Cope/Bräm/Haubenstock-Ramati/Lorentzen/Kaczynski

Ensemble MW2
Vienna Modern Masters: VMM 2024

An introduction to electronic music 
Record CHESTER JWC 1001

Format: Vinyl, LP; Country: UK; Released: 1968

Style: Musique Concrète, Education, Spoken Word, Experimental

Credits: Compilation Producer, Narrator - Bent Lorentzen

A Wondrous Love Story - Tristan Variation

Opera. Label: Kontrapunkt. 2005

 "Erotic Hymns" - "Four Danish Chorale Motets" - Flamma (organ and percussion) - Triplex (organ) - Saturnus (organ)

Morten Frank Larsen (barytone). Jens E. Christensen (organ). Joanna Stroz (percussion.

Label: dacapo 8.226568

References

 Bonde, Lars Ole (2005): Den folkelige avantgardist. Om lyd, vitalitet og humor i Bent Lorentzens musikalske univers. In: Lorentzen, L. & Nielsen, F.V. (Eds.) Skriftfest. Bent Lorentzen og hans musik.
 Bonde, Lars Ole (2012): Drama, Dialogue, and Duel. A portrait of the composer Bent Lorentzen. Cover notes to CD "Erotic Hymns". Dacapo 8.226568

External links 
 Article by Anders Beyer about Bent Lorentzen and a list of his works at Edition S
   Selection of recordings by Bent Lorentzen at Naxos America 
 Biography and recordings of Bent Lorentzen by Dacapo Records
  Fackeltanz; Video excerpts
  Der Steppenwolf; Video excerpts
  Visions (1978). Electronic Music
  Pergolesi's Home Service. WKNO Radio-Interview with Susan Owen-Leinert and Michael Leinert

1935 births
2018 deaths
20th-century classical composers
Danish classical composers
Danish male classical composers
Royal Danish Academy of Music alumni
Prix Italia winners
20th-century male musicians
People from Syddjurs Municipality